Sungdong Group (성동조선) is a South Korean shipbuilding company with four operating units. The company was established in 2001 by Jung Hong Jun, originally a welding specialist who obtained more than 80 patents personally. Sungdong Shipyard was initially commenced its shipbuilding business as ship block manufacturing company to Samsung Heavy Industry. After the big success of block builder, Mr. Jung Hong Jun, Founder, introduced Gripper Translift System to shipbuilding technology, and this technology enables the shipbuilding without dry-dock building. Its first order was 8 units of 93,000 DWT Bulk Carrier from Greek Shipping Company, Marmaras Navigation in August 2004. After its first delivery in January 2007, Sungdong has delivered more than 250 vessels without dry-dock until 2018. Considering the Drydocking system taking the 24 hours to launching the ship, Gripper Translift System takes only 4 hours for launching the vessel.

With the golden year of the shipyard, the Sungdong one time record as one of the world's top 4 shipyards according to the Clarkson's Research 2007. Currently, the yard is under control of the court.

References

External links

Shipbuilding companies of South Korea
Companies established in 2001
South Korean brands